Rhynchopyga xanthospila is a moth in the subfamily Arctiinae. It is found in Bolivia.

References

Moths described in 1898
Euchromiina